Buxton with Lamas is a civil parish in Broadland in the English county of Norfolk. It comprises the villages of Buxton lying to the west of the River Bure and Lamas on the eastern side of the river. Buxton has a halt on the railway. The former railway station on the Great Eastern Railway was called Buxton Lamas prior to closure of the line.

For local government purposes, the two villages jointly elect Buxton with Lamas Parish Council, and fall within the area covered by Broadland District Council and Norfolk County Council.

The civil parish had a population (including Little Hautbois) of 1,685 at the 2001 census, falling marginally to 1,684 at the 2011 census.

A rather grand white water mill also crosses between Buxton and Lamas.

See also
List of places in Norfolk

References

External links

Parish council website

Civil parishes in Norfolk
Broadland